Pyrrocoma lucida is a species of flowering plant in the family Asteraceae known by the common names sticky goldenweed and sticky pyrrocoma. It is endemic to California, where it is known only from the northern Sierra Nevada. It grows in mountain forests and clay flats with alkali soils. It is hairless and glandular, its surface resinous and shiny. The leaves are lance-shaped with sharply toothed edges, the largest near the base of the stem reaching  in length. The inflorescence is a narrow spikelike array of many flower heads lined with thick, overlapping, gland-dotted phyllaries. Each head contains up to 40 yellow disc florets surrounded by a fringe of up to 20 yellow ray florets. The fruit is an achene up to a centimeter long including its pappus.

References

External links
Jepson Manual Treatment
USDA Plants Profile
Flora of North America
Photo gallery

lucida
Endemic flora of California